Allen David Crawley (born 15 May 1941 in Tasmania) is a former long jumper, triple jumper and sprinter who competed in the 1968 Summer Olympics, finishing sixth in the long jump, representing Australia.

Crawley won a bronze medal for Australia at the 1966 British Empire and Commonwealth Games in the 4×110 yards relay. Previously, he represented Papua and New Guinea at the 1962 British Empire and Commonwealth Games, competing in the 100 yards, the 4×110 yards relay, the long jump and the triple jump. He was educated at the Anglican Church Grammar School.

References

External links
 Allen Crawley at Australian Athletics Historical Results
 Alan Crawley at trackfield.brinkster.net
 
 
 

1941 births
Living people
Sportsmen from Tasmania
Papua New Guinean male sprinters
Papua New Guinean long jumpers
Papua New Guinean triple jumpers
Australian male sprinters
Australian male long jumpers
Olympic athletes of Australia
Athletes (track and field) at the 1968 Summer Olympics
Athletes (track and field) at the 1962 British Empire and Commonwealth Games
Athletes (track and field) at the 1966 British Empire and Commonwealth Games
Commonwealth Games competitors for Papua New Guinea
Commonwealth Games bronze medallists for Australia
Commonwealth Games medallists in athletics
People educated at Anglican Church Grammar School
Medallists at the 1966 British Empire and Commonwealth Games